Secrets of Deltora is a fictional book in the Deltora Quest series written by Emily Rodda and illustrated by Marc McBride. This book is a fictional travel guide around Deltora, written from the point of view of Doran the Dragonlover.

References

2009 Australian novels
2009 fantasy novels
Books about dragons
Deltora
Fictional atlases